Corsica Coachworks was a small British coachbuilding business founded in 1920 just after World War I. They were builders of bespoke car bodies, employing no in-house designer. They realised customers' designs for them. Almost every Corsica body is unique.

History
Corsica Coachworks was run by Charles Henry Stammers (1884-1945), his brothers-in-law, Joseph and Robert Lee, and Albert Wood. The company name referred to the address of its original premises in Corsica Street, Highbury (Islington, North London). After a few years the business relocated further out of town to an alleyway off The Broadway, Cricklewood (Northwest London). Throughout its existence Corsica Coachworks remained small, never employing more than 20 people.

Products
Most Corsica bodies were fitted to the more sporting types of car, with bodies produced for Daimler, Bentley, Bugatti, Alfa Romeo, British Salmson, Frazer Nash, Humber, Lea-Francis, Rolls-Royce and Wolseley models. 

At least 14 Bugatti Type 57s were furnished with Corsica bodies. One of the most notable Corsica bodied Type 57 cars was made using a chassis with parts from a famous Bugatti racing car. Bugatti was known for reusing and re-purposing chassis from their racing cars, then shipping the bare chassis to a customer for a new custom body. The Corsica Bugatti Type 57 Surbaisse 3.3-Litre Four-Seat Sports (1937) was made with an English style sporting body, completely unlike the typical Type 57 sporting bodies from continental European coachbuilders. And the chassis rails have been identified as the very same parts used in a Le Mans Type 57 "Tank" Streamliner.

Just as the business was closed at the beginning of the war the company completed a Rolls-Royce limousine for Princess Marie Louise "and there may have been a few others like it".

Design
Every body would have been unique but a few dealers required short runs of a particular shape. If the owner's ideas on a body shape were too unformed, a contract draughtsman would be called in. The foreman body maker, Bert Skinner, would draw the entire body on plywood hanging on the wall including full-scale sideviews. After the body's frame had been built, the sheet aluminium or Dural would be shaped around it. Wings (mudguards) would be first outlined freehand in wire, then metal shaped to fit.

Employees
At peak:
 Screenmaking and fittings 3
 Paint shop 4
 Trimming shop 3
 Body shop up to 7
 Panel shop 3
 wing maker
 blacksmith
These details have been supplied from memory not records.

Famous customers
Sir Malcolm Campbell,
Ford Dagenham,
Nico Embiricos,
'Taso' Mathiesen,
Colonel Giles,
Colonel Sorrel (Bugatti London),
Forrest Lycett,
Cecil Kimber,
Donald Healey

Legacy
The two most important principals, C. H. Stammers and Joseph Lee, died during World War II. Their premises were sold to S Smith & Sons. Robert (Dick) Lee moved to coachbuilders Alpe & Saunders in Kew, then formed FLM Panelcraft in High Street, Putney, moving later to Battersea (Fry, Lee, McNally).  They made the bodies for HWM cars, the famous Gulbenkian taxi and the Tulipwood Hispano-Suiza.

References
 Mike McCarthy, The Boys from Kings Cross, Classic and Sportscar magazine, p.p. 110-115, June 1991. Interview with Jack and Charles Stammers, sons of the founder.
 Nick Walker: A–Z of British Coachbuilders 1919–1960. Shebbear 2007 (Herridge & Sons Ltd.) .

References

External links

Images not otherwise available:
 Bugatti 57SC for Colonel G M Giles. Possibly Corsica's most famous car
 Bugatti for Colonel Giles front
 The same car in 2000
 8-Litre with body by Corsica Bentley
 Embiricos overturned this car in the TT and came out with only a cut finger
 Squire drophead coupé prototype 1937
 1938 Corsica-bodied lea-Francis Sports

Corsica
Vehicle manufacture in London
Vehicle manufacturing companies established in 1920
1920 establishments in England